Colla micacea is a moth in the family Bombycidae. It was described by Francis Walker in 1865. It is found in Colombia and French Guiana.

References

Bombycidae
Moths described in 1865